The Nike OTC Marathon (sometimes styled "Nike/Oregon Track Club Marathon") was a marathon held annually from 1973–1984 in Eugene, Oregon. It was organized by the Oregon Track Club (OTC) and sponsored by Nike.

The women's world record for the marathon was set at the Nike OTC Marathon by Jacqueline Hansen, who ran 2:38:19 in 1975.

The American women's marathon record was broken four times at the Nike OTC Marathon in the 1970s and 1980s, by Jacqueline Hansen (2:38:19 in 1975), Kim Merritt (2:37:57 in 1977), Julie Brown (2:36:23 in 1978), and Joan Benoit (2:26:11 in 1982). The Boston Marathon is the only other race that has been the venue for more than three American women's marathon records.

Winners

Notes

See also
Eugene Marathon (2007–present)

References

1973 establishments in Oregon
1984 disestablishments in Oregon
Annual events in Eugene, Oregon
Marathons in the United States
Recurring sporting events established in 1973
Sports competitions in Oregon
Sports in Eugene, Oregon